Shortridge's long-fingered bat (Miniopterus shortridgei) is a bat in the genus Miniopterus which occurs throughout Indonesia. It was described by Eleanor Mary Ord Laurie and John Edwards Hill in 1957.

References

Miniopteridae
Mammals described in 1957
Taxa named by John Edwards Hill
Bats of Southeast Asia
Taxa named by Eleanor Mary Ord Laurie